Oleg Viktorovich Maltsev (born on April 17, 1975) is a Ukrainian Candidate of Sciences in psychology and philosophy,. He is the academician of the European Academy of Sciences of Ukraine, author, criminologist. 
He teaches a variation of the Fate Analysis method developed by Hungarian psychoanalyst Leopold Szondi through his organization called Applied Sciences Association. He is the chief editor of interdisciplinary journal Baudrillard Now, editorial member of French journal Dogma and editorial member of Expedition Journal among other publications.

Biography 
Oleg V. Maltsev was born in Ukraine in 1975.  

In 2014, Maltsev and collaborators established several organizations including the "Memory Institute", with the "Applied Science Association" serving as an umbrella organization.
In 2016, Maltsev's group was accused of being a 'cult' by Alexander Dvorkin, the vice-president of European Federation of Centres of Research and Information on Sectarianism.

In 2017, Maltsev authored a book entitled Non-compromised Pendulum on boxing trainer Cus DAmato and his methods.  Maltsev's co-author was Tom Patti, a student of DAmato.  The work received positive reviews in Sports Illustrated and The Ring.

In August 2019, Oleg Maltsev, together with two other Ukrainian scientists, presented a joint monograph on the disclosure of Serial killings. Oleg Maltsev in this work did the bulk devoted to the description of the psycho-portrait of a serial killer.

In 2019, Maltsev  was elected chairman of the Odessa Photographic Society.

Exponents of the anti-cult movement in Russia and Ukraine have criticized his association as a cult.

Criminology  
Maltsev is the head of non-profit institute named Centre for Criminology in Ukraine. He has been exploring the origin and methods used by various criminal organizations such as Southern Italian 'Ndrangheta, Camorra and Sicilian Mafia; Russian and South African criminal traditions. Maltsev explained main reason behind his studies in the this field during round table on criminology and in the interviews with Johnny Steinberg and Antonio Nicaso, that the better people are informed about the way criminals operate, the better countermeasures can be taken for the safety of civilian communities and businesses. In his view, criminal environment is the foundation that shapes mentality of criminals. Oleg Maltsev is Professor of Spanish Destreza and author of several books that are devoted exclusively to weapon handling of criminal organizations. Maltsev is the proponent of primary sources and within the research of weapon handling, he headed the group of his collaborators and translators that translated more than twenty 15-19th century treatises into Russian language from old Spanish, old Italian and old German for weapon handling analysis. Among those treatises are work of Gérard Thibault d'Anvers, Don Jerónimo Sánchez de Carranza, Luis Pacheco de Narváez, Nicoletto Giganti, Blasco Florio, Salvator Fabris.

Books 
 Maestro. Jean Baudrillard. The Last Prophet of Europe
 Non compromised Pendulum
 Lightning Rod that strikes faster than lightning itself
 Enigma or Crime: Real Life and Economics

Notes

References 

 Szondi, Leopold (1953). Mensch und Schicksal. Elemente einer dialektischen Schiksalswissenschaft (Anankologie). (Wissenschaft und Weltbild 7). Vienna: Verlag Harold.

External links 
 Oleg Maltsev Website

Ukrainian psychologists
1975 births
Living people
Odesa Jews
Ukrainian philosophers
Odesa University alumni
Scientists from Odesa